Donyi-Polo (also Donyi-Poloism) is the designation given to the indigenous religion, of animistic and shamanic type, of the Tani and other Tibeto-Burman peoples of Arunachal Pradesh and Assam in Northeast India. The name "Donyi-Polo" means "Sun-Moon", and was chosen for the religion in the process of its revitalisation and institutionalisation. The Donyi- Poloism has been there from since immemorial.

The religion has developed a congregational system; hymns to be sung, composed in the Tani ritual language of shamans; a formalised philosophy-theology; and an iconography of the gods and temples. The pioneer of the revival was Talom Rukbo. Donyi-Polo is related to the Hemphu-Mukrang religion of the Karbi and the Nyezi-No of the Hruso.

Theology and cosmology

Sedi and Keyum
In the Donyi-Polo belief, the fountain god that begets the universe (God or the Godhead) is referred to as Sedi by the Minyong and Padam, Jimi by the Galo. All things and beings are parts of the body of Sedi: in creation, the hair of Sedi becomes the plants of the earth, his tears become rain and water, his bones become rocks and stones, and his two eyes become Donyi (the Sun) and Polo (the Moon). Sedi, after creation, is a deus otiosus but continues to observe creation through his eyes, his double aspect veiling-unveiling-revealing himself.

In Galo beliefs, Jimi manifests as Melo (Sky) and Sidi (Earth), out of the interaction of which all things and beings are born, including Donyi and Polo. There are other myths explaining the meaning of the duality Donyi and Polo.

According to Talom Rukbo's theology, all celestial bodies including Earth, all things, originate from one source, Keyum (nothingness or the vacuum). Donyi-Polo is the polar force that generates all stars; the physical Sun and Moon (respectively, Bomong and Boo) near the Earth and humanity, are bodily manifestations of the universal unseen power Donyi-Polo, with Bomong carrying out the centralising power of Donyi, and Boo the Polo power of life-giving.

Donyi and Polo
Donyi (Sun) and Polo (Moon)—which are, respectively, female and male in the Tibeto-Burman tradition; called Ane Donyi ("Mother Sun") and Abo Polo ("Father Moon")—constitute a notion similar to the yin and yang of Chinese culture. It is the analogy through which the Divinity (Sedi) can be described, representing the way in which the divine principle manifests itself, that is: eternally veiling, unveiling and then revealing himself in nature; providing harmony and balance to the universe, for example in the alternation of light and darkness, heat and cool, or unity (analogically, the Sun of the daily sky) and multiplicity (analogically, the stars of the night sky).

The practical expression of the faith in Donyi-Polo can be found in the daily life and actions of people: they call themselves "Donyi O, Polo Ome", meaning "children of the sun and the moon". When a believer is distressed he invokes "Donyi-Polo". If a man is falsely accused 
of lying he invokes "Donyi-e!", "oh Sun!". All these are expressions of faith in Donyi-Polo upholding providently the world, rewarding the righteous and punishing wrong-doers. The divine pair is revered as the highest holy figure governing fate.

"Donyi-Polo" is also used in the sense of "truth" in sacral speech. "Donyi-Polo" is the epitome of wisdom, enlightenment, right conscience, truthfulness, and selflessness. Aware people are called "Donyi-Polo Ome", which means "children of truth". Elders are regarded as "Donyi-Polo Abu", "representatives of the truth".

Gods
The followers of Donyi-Poloism worship a variety of gods and goddesses that enliven nature. These gods are believed to partake in the universal balance of Donyi and Polo, and to be multiple manifestations or identities of Sedi—Donyi-Polo, each with specific functions and roles. It is believed that they take care of the earth and humanity. The main deities in Donyi-Polo are Donyi and Polo, Kine Nane, Doying Bote, Pedong Nane and Guumin Soyin.

Abotani
Tani-speaking peoples (Lhoba, Tagin, Galo, Nyishi, Nah, Apatani, Mishing, Adi) share a myth telling of their descendance from the progenitor Abotani. Other Tibeto-Burman peoples of Arunachal Pradesh who share the Donyi-Polo faith don't subscribe to the descendance from Abotani.

Abotani is thought to represent the evolution of the human being from the source Donyi, Sedi, the eye of the universe as important to man as the eye of the body. The Divinity has projected man showing him the right way to go.

Conscience and ethics
Donyi-Poloists describe the "Donyi-Polo" nature of the universe as the eyes of human conscience. Happiness is given through right action, and right action is that which follows the order of nature (Donyi-Polo).

Oshang Ering, a philosopher of the religion, has written that as the two objects in the sky (Bomong and Boo) focus light to enable us to see what is what, Donyi-Polo makes us aware of what is wrong and right. Right conscience naturally prevails, and when a person does wrong things (acts against the natural order) and tries to hide it, or masks it as good, then the force of conscience (Donyi-Polo) imposes a psychological pression, and the wrongdoer loses happiness.

Right conscience naturally guides man. According to the traditional belief, love, compassion, equality and selflessness are naturally ordained by Donyi-Polo; they are inscribed in nature. The ethical dimension of Donyi-Polo also means purity, beauty, simplicity, and frankness.

Institution
On 28 August 1968, a meeting of Adi intellectuals was held in Along, West Siang, to discuss countermeasures to be taken against the gradual erosion of indigenous identity and traditions attributed to India's policy of integration of Arunachal Pradesh, and particularly the spread of Christianity in the area since the 1950s which has caused an enduring crisis in the cultural mosaic of the north-eastern state. The meeting's aim was also that of uniting the Tibeto-Burman folks under a collective identity and values for a good life.

Talom Rukbo emerged as the father of Donyi-Poloism, a term that was coined for the institutionalisation of the Tibeto-Burman folk religion. According to Rukbo, the main reason for the easy erosion of the traditional culture was that it lacked written literature. So, with the aim of recovering the endangered rituals, prayers, and hymns, within 1986 three major cultural organisations were founded: the Tani Jagriti Foundation, the Donyi-Polo Youth Federation, and the Donyi-Polo Yelam Kebang.

Rikbo expressed the need for institutionalization of the traditional faith in these terms:
«Tradition means the way of living of a society practicing its socio-religious culture, economic life, the way of preserving history, literature, and all other norms of social life inherited from time immemorial which may be called social character and identity».

Many Adi and Tani intellectuals reflected Rukbo's ideas, and these gradually spread across the tribes and even beyond the Tani people. The 31 December, the day of establishment of the Donyi-Polo Yelam Kebang in 1986, has been made the "Donyi-Polo Day" celebrated each year.

Since then, templar areas have been consecrated, religious literature and prayer hymns have been collected and published. To meet the growing number of adherents in the revival, the Donyi-Polo Yelam Kebang established orientation courses—which take place twice a year—and trained groups of youth to send back with books and icons to their home village, to encourage people to construct temples and conduct prayers. During the last two decades the spiritual revival has spread all over Arunachal Pradesh.

Supporters of the revival have coined the slogan «Loss of culture is loss of identity» which has become very popular. The indirect implication is that those who convert to Christianity lose their culture and hence their identity.

Gangging
A  is a general name for a prayer place of the Donyi-Poloist faith, and especially in the Adi areas. The  as a sacred enclosure is a concept popularised by the Donyi-Polo Yelam Kebang since 1996. 

According to Talom Rukbo, the word  is derived from Gangging Siring, the concept of land or holy tree that mediates between the spiritual and the natural worlds, and from which any thing, living or non-living, comes into existence.

Gangging congregants have to follow certain rules: for example, male members must sit on the left in rows, and female members on the right, cross-legged. Within the prayer place, there should not be any noise during prayer except the sound of the hymns. Prayers are organized in the prayer place on Sundays, and all of the  branches established in each of the villages under the Siang district are centrally regulated by the Donyi-Polo Yelam Kebang. Through the prayer place, codified rituals and practices, and iconographies of the Gods and Goddesses have been introduced.

Ethnic variations
In Galo areas, the prayer place and community halls (dere) have come up under the patronage of the Donyi-Polo Welfare Association and they are being built since the 2000s. Priests (nyibu) conduct prayers in the prayer place on Sundays. In Apatani areas, the religion is called "Danyi-Piilo" and prayer place are called meder nello ("purified place"), the first of which was built in 2004, songs and prayers are collected in a prayer book called Lyambope. Donyi-Poloist prayer place in Nishi areas are called  ("pure place"), and also among them the movement has been started only in the early 2000s.

More recently, the success of Donyi-Polo has crossed the Tani cultural borders inspiring the rise of Rangfraism among the Tangsa, and of Intayaism among the Mishmi, respectively in Changlang and Dibang Valley.

See also

 Tribal religions in India
 Bathouism
 Indigenous religion
 Sanamahism
 Sarnaism

Notes

References

Citations

Sources

External links

 

 
Religion in India
Indian religions
Asian ethnic religion
Sacred groves of India